"Opposite of Adults" is a song by American hip hop duo Chiddy Bang. It was released in the United Kingdom on February 21, 2010. The song contains samples of "Kids" by MGMT. It was released in the United States on April 20, 2010. It was released online to blogs under the name "Kids" approximately one year prior to that. In late 2010, "Opposite of Adults" was featured as the background music for the Need for Speed: Hot Pursuit video game commercial, as well as in the game, in an episode of Rob Dyrdek's Fantasy Factory, and in episode 8 of Friday Night Lights 's fifth season. The song was also used in the trailer for 30 Minutes or Less. It was also the goal song for Team North America (World Cup of Hockey 2016).

Critical reception
Fraser McAlpine of BBC Chart Blog awarded the song five stars and gave a positive review, stating:

"Oh now this is the kind of thing we can all get behind, isn't it? Song titles as crossword clues! You don't even have to know that this is largely based on reswizzled chunks of the MGMT song 'Kids', because you can work it out from the title".

Chart performance

On February 28, 2010, "Opposite of Adults" entered the UK Singles Chart at No.12. The following week, the single fell four places to No.16, where it remained for three consecutive weeks. On its fifth week in the chart, the single fell three places to No.19. The following week, the single fell a further two places to No.21. On April 11, 2010, the single fell to No.22 and the following week fell a further eight to No.30, marking the single's eighth week in the UK Singles Chart.

The single also debuted on the Irish Singles Chart on February 25, 2010, at No.49. The following week, the single climbed 17 places to No.32, which was followed by a further 12 places to No.20 the week after. On March 18, 2010, the single climbed four places to No.16 and the following week climbed a further three places to No.13. On April 1, 2010, the single climbed three places to its current peak of No.10, marking Chiddy Bang's first top 10 hit in Ireland. However, on its seventh week in the chart, the single fell five places to No.15. On April 15, 2010, the single fell a further six places to No.21.

The single also managed to debut on the Australian Singles Chart and the New Zealand Singles Chart on April 5, 2010, at a peak of No.36. The following week, the single remained at No.36. In its fourth week in the chart, the single rose 11 places to No.22. It has thus far peaked at No.10 in Australia while in New Zealand, it achieved a top ten peak of No.8.

"Opposite of Adults" debuted at No.90 on the Billboard Hot 100 and has recently re-entered at No.100.

Track listing
12" vinyl
"Opposite of Adults" – 3:15
"Chiddy Freestyle" – 2:09
"Sooner or Later" – 3:16

Digital download
"Opposite of Adults" – 3:15
"Chiddy Freestyle" – 2:09
"Sooner or Later" – 3:16

7" vinyl
"Opposite of Adults" - 3:15
"Sooner or Later" - 3:16

Charts

Weekly charts

Year-end charts

Certifications

Release history

References

External links
 

2010 debut singles
Record Store Day releases
2010 songs
Songs written by Andrew VanWyngarden
Songs written by Benjamin Goldwasser